, there were 10 battery electric vehicles and 12 plug-in hybrid vehicles registered in the Northwest Territories.

Government policy
, the territorial government offered tax rebates of $5,000 for electric vehicle purchases, and $500 for charging station installations; however, the territorial government does not offer any tax incentives.

Charging stations
, there were six public charging stations in the Northwest Territories, all of which were AC level 2.

Manufacturing
The Northwest Territories has been proposed as a hub for mining of minerals for use in electric vehicles.

References

Northwest Territories
Transport in the Northwest Territories